Kurosawa (written: 黒沢 or 黒澤 lit. "black swamp") is a Japanese surname. Notable people with the surname include:

Akira Kurosawa (1910-1998), highly acclaimed filmmaker
Asuka Kurosawa (1971- ), actress and model
Kazuko Kurosawa (1954- ), costume designer and daughter of Akira
Kinko Kurosawa  (1710-1771), komusō and music collector
Kowloon Kurosawa (1971- ), essayist and nonfiction writer 
Kiyoshi Kurosawa (1955- ), film director
Manabu Nakanishi (1967- ), Japanese professional wrestler who temporarily wrestled as Kurosawa
Mirena Kurosawa (2001- ), tarento and idol
Motoharu Kurosawa (1940- ), racing driver and father to racing drivers Haruki, Tsubasa, and Takuya
Takuya Kurosawa (1962- ), racing driver, son of Motoharu Kurosawa
Paulo Kurosawa, producer of MNL48 and president of Hallo Hallo Entertainment
Tomoyo Kurosawa (1996- ), Japanese actress and singer

Fictional characters
Minamo Kurosawa, a character in the manga series Azumanga Daioh
Kurosawa Hiroharu, a character in the anime series Sky Girls
Ryokan Kurosawa and his twin daughters Yae and Sae, characters in the video game Fatal Frame
Dia and Ruby Kurosawa, characters in the multimedia project Love Live! Sunshine!!
Takashi Kurosawa, a character in the film The Hitman's Bodyguard

Japanese-language surnames